Richard Franks (11 April 1870 – 3 July 1938) was an Australian politician.

He was born in Beckington in Somerset. His Father was James Franks and mother Esther Dainton. In 1922 he was elected to the Tasmanian House of Assembly as a Country Party member for Darwin. He retired in 1925. Franks died in Elliott in 1938.

References

1870 births
1938 deaths
National Party of Australia members of the Parliament of Tasmania
Members of the Tasmanian House of Assembly